Santa Elena, officially the Municipality of Santa Elena, is a 3rd class municipality in the province of Camarines Norte, Philippines. According to the 2020 census, it has a population of 43,582 people.

Geography

Barangays
Santa Elena is politically subdivided into 19 barangays.

Notes:
 Barangay acquired from Calauag, Quezon, due to boundary realignment from Macahadok River to Tabugon Stream adjoining Quezon Canal in Barangay Tabansak, Calauag, Quezon.
 Former political dispute between Capalonga, Camarines Norte, and then Calauag, Quezon.

Climate

Demographics

Economy

References

External links
 [ Philippine Standard Geographic Code]
Philippine Census Information

Municipalities of Camarines Norte